Cleryston David Novais (born 15 October 1992) is a Brazilian handball player for Beykoz Belediyespor and the Brazilian national team.

He participated in the 2017 World Men's Handball Championship.

References

1992 births
Living people
Brazilian male handball players
Expatriate handball players in Turkey
Brazilian expatriate sportspeople in Turkey
21st-century Brazilian people